John Ruthven may refer to:

 John Ruthven, 3rd Earl of Gowrie (c.1577-1600), Scottish politician
 John A. Ruthven (1924–2020), American painter
 John Ruthven (general) (17th century), military officer in Denmark and Sweden